Estadio Huachipato-CAP Acero (Compañía de Acero del Pacífico), is a football stadium in Talcahuano, Chile.  It is the home field of the Huachipato football team. Until 2012, Naval also played its home matches there until 2012. Opened in 2009, it replaced the old Estadio Las Higueras, which was demolished in 2008. The stadium capacity is 10,500 people (all-seated).

References

External links 
 Official Page
 Blog about the construction progress

CAP
Sports venues in Biobío Region
Sports venues completed in 2009